Michigan's 22nd Senate district is one of 38 districts in the Michigan Senate. The 22nd district was created by the 1850 Michigan Constitution, as the 1835 constitution only permitted a maximum of eight senate districts. It has been represented by Republican Lana Theis since 2019, succeeding fellow Republican Joe Hune.

Geography
District 22 encompasses all of Livingston County, as well as part of Genesee, Ingham, and Shiawassee counties.

2011 Apportionment Plan
District 22, as dictated by the 2011 Apportionment Plan, covered all of Livingston County and most of western Washtenaw County in exurban Detroit, including the communities of Brighton, Howell, Fowlerville, Whitmore Lake, Chelsea, Dexter, Brighton Township, Genoa Township, Green Oak Township, Hamburg Township, Hartland Township, Oceola Township, Tyrone Township, Marion Township, and Scio Township.

The district was largely located within Michigan's 8th congressional district, also extended into the 7th and 12th districts. It overlapped with the 42nd, 47th, and 52nd districts of the Michigan House of Representatives.

List of senators

Recent election results

2018

2014

Federal and statewide results in District 22

Historical district boundaries

References 

22
Livingston County, Michigan
Washtenaw County, Michigan